was a town located in Kume District, Okayama Prefecture, Japan.

As of 2003, the town had an estimated population of 3,382 and a density of 40.75 persons per km2. The total area was 82.99 km2.

On March 22, 2005, Asahi, along with the towns of Chūō and Yanahara (all from Kume District), was merged to create the town of Misaki.

Dissolved municipalities of Okayama Prefecture